The 2019 IIHF U20 Challenge Cup of Asia was an international men's under-20 ice hockey tournament run by the International Ice Hockey Federation (IIHF). The tournament took place between 5 December and 8 December 2018 in Kuala Lumpur, Malaysia and was the fifth edition held since its formation in 2012 under the IIHF Challenge Cup of Asia series of tournaments. Malaysia won the tournament after finishing first in the standings. Kyrgyzstan finished in second place and the Philippines finished third.

Overview
The 2019 IIHF U20 Challenge Cup of Asia began on 5 December 2018 in Kuala Lumpur, Malaysia with games played at the Malaysia National Ice Skating Stadium (MyNISS). The defending champions Malaysia, Kyrgyzstan, the Philippines and the United Arab Emirates returned after finishing in the top four of the 2018 tournament. India, who finished fifth in 2018, did not return. The tournament ran alongside the 2019 IIHF U20 Challenge Cup of Asia Division I competition with all games being held in Kuala Lumpur.

The tournament consisted of a single round-robin with each team competing in three games. Malaysia won the tournament after winning all three of their games to finish at the top of the standings. The win was Malaysia's second gold medal of the competition having won their first in 2018. Kyrgyzstan finished second after losing only to Malaysia and the Philippines finished in third. Malaysia's Mohammad Hariz Mohammad Oryza Ananda led the tournament in scoring with 14 points and Temir Muktarbek of Kyrgyzstan finished as the leading goaltender with a save percentage of 90.70. Malaysia's Chee Ming Bryan Lim was named the most valuable player and Mohamed Alkaabi of the United Arab Emirates was named best forward by the IIHF Directorate. Kyrgyzstan's Ernazar Isamatov was named best defenceman and Jaiden Mackale Roxas of the Philippines was named best goaltender.

Standings
The final standings of the tournament.

Fixtures
All times are local. (MST – UTC+8)

Scoring leaders
List shows the top ten skaters sorted by points, then goals, assists, a greater plus-minus, and then lower penalties in minutes.

Leading goaltenders
Only the top goaltenders, based on save percentage, who have played at least 40% of their team's minutes are included in this list.

References

External links
Tournament page at IIHF.com

IIHF Women's Challenge Cup of Asia
IIHF Challenge Cups of Asia
International ice hockey competitions hosted by Malaysia
December 2019 sports events in Asia
Asian ice hockey competitions for junior teams